Leeds was a European Parliament constituency, centred on Leeds in the West Yorkshire area of England.

Prior to its uniform adoption of proportional representation in 1999, the United Kingdom used first-past-the-post for the European elections in England, Scotland and Wales. The European Parliament constituencies used under that system were smaller than the later regional constituencies and only had one Member of the European Parliament each.

When it was created in England in 1979, it consisted of the Westminster Parliament constituencies of Batley and Morley, Leeds East, Leeds North East, Leeds North West, Leeds South, Leeds South East, Leeds West and Pudsey.  In 1984, Batley and Morley, Leeds South and Leeds South West were replaced by Elmet, Leeds Central and Morley and Leeds South.

In 1999, the constituency became part of the much larger Yorkshire and the Humber constituency.

Members of the European Parliament

Results

References

External links
 David Boothroyd's United Kingdom Election Results

European Parliament constituencies in England (1979–1999)
Politics of Leeds
History of Leeds
Political history of Yorkshire
1979 establishments in England
1999 disestablishments in England
Constituencies established in 1979
Constituencies disestablished in 1999